Baghcheh (also Romanized as Bāghcheh; also known as Baghcheh Mehraban and Bāghicheh) is a village in Shirin Su Rural District, Shirin Su District, Kabudarahang County, Hamadan Province, Iran. At the 2006 census, its population was 389, in 87 families.

References 

Populated places in Kabudarahang County